John Welborn (November 20, 1857 – October 27, 1907) was an American politician who represented Missouri in the United States House of Representatives from 1905 to 1907.

Biography
Welborn was born near Aullville, Missouri on November 20, 1857. He attended the public schools, and graduated from the Warrensburg State Normal School in 1876.  Welborn taught school while studying law with John J. Cockrell (son of Francis Cockrell), and he attained admission to the bar in 1880.  He practiced in Lexington, Missouri, where he served as city recorder from 1890 to 1891, and mayor from 1896 to 1900.  In 1898 he was an unsuccessful candidate for Congress.  Welborn served on the board of regents for the Warrensburg Normal School, and was a delegate to the Republican National Convention in 1900.

He was elected as a Republican to the Fifty-ninth Congress (March 4, 1905 – March 3, 1907).  Welborn was an unsuccessful candidate for reelection in 1906 to the Sixtieth Congress. After leaving Congress, he resumed the practice of law.

Welborn died in Lexington on October 27, 1907, just seven months after the end of his term in Congress.  He was buried at Machpelah Cemetery in Lexington.

References

External links

1857 births
1907 deaths
People from Lexington, Missouri
Mayors of places in Missouri
Republican Party members of the United States House of Representatives from Missouri
19th-century American politicians